Events from the year 1661 in France

Incumbents
 Monarch – Louis XIV

Events
The Paris Opera Ballet established
The Académie Royale de Danse established

Births

 1 November – Louis, Grand Dauphin, heir apparent to the throne (died 1711)

Full date missing
Daniel d'Auger de Subercase, naval officer (died 1732)

Deaths

Full date missing
Girard Desargues, mathematician (born 1591)
René Menard, Jesuit missionary (born 1605)
Louis Couperin, composer (born c.1626)
Georges de Brébeuf, poet (born 1618)

See also

References

1660s in France